Indian Grove may refer to:

 Indian Grove, listed on the NRHP in Colorado
 Indian Grove Township, Livingston County, Illinois
 Indian Grove, Missouri
 Indian Grove, North Carolina